To be distinguished from Joseph Askhenazi (1928-1974)
Rabbi Joseph Ashkenazi (1525–1572) the Tanna of Safed was a critical commentator on the Mishnah, whose glosses are noted in Solomon Adeni's Mele'khet Shelomo.

References

External links
 Joseph Ashkenazi Jewish Encyclopedia

Rabbis in Safed
1525 births
1572 deaths